The Kingdom of Warri, Warri Kingdom or Iwere Kingdom, (Itsekiri: Oye Iwere) was established in 1480, was part of the Nigerian traditional states its ancestral Capital is based in Ode-Itsekiri, Warri South LGA, Delta State, Nigeria with a palace erected in 1950s in the multi-ethnic city of Warri, Warri South LGA, Delta State, Nigeria.

The current Olu of Warri is Ogiame Atuwatse III, who was crowned on 21 August 2021.

History

According to Bini and Itsekiri histories, Olu Ginuwa, a prince of Benin Kingdom founded the Warri kingdom about 1480.
In the 15th century it was visited by Portuguese missionaries.
At the beginning of the 17th century, a son of the reigning Olu was sent to Portugal and returned with a Portuguese wife. Their son Antonio Domingo was Olu of Warri in the 1640s.
Olu Erejuwa, who reigned from about 1720 to 1800, expanded the kingdom politically and commercially, using the Portuguese to further its independence of Bini and to establish control over a wider area.

Later Warri served as the base for Portuguese and Dutch slave traders. Warri became a more important port city during the late 19th century, when it became a centre for the palm oil trade and other major items such as rubber, palm products, cocoa, groundnuts, hides, and skins.
Warri was established as a provincial headquarters by the British in the early 20th century.

The Size Of The Kingdom Of Warri

In the work of Jean-François Landolphe published from his diary described the size of Warri Kingdom “The sovereign of this state owns not only both banks of the Benin river but also all the rivers of these parts as far as the tributaries of the Calabar or are near to it."

Military 
In 1656, the equipment of the Warri military was dominated by arrows and javelins with the use of few muskets. By the following century, Warri forces became accustomed to firearms. In the late 18th century, the naval vessels of Warri were equipped with simple sails and primary sources documented that such vessels could carry some personnel of about 100. According to historian Thornton, the Warri navy was unfamiliar with tacking. Shields were built onto the vessels to provide protection for the personnel. Warri vessels may have utilized artillery. Jean-François Landolphe provided a description of the King's canoes in the early 19th century which he mentions to have mounted 7 blunderbusses arranged in series on a swivel. As a result, these guns could fire simultaneously and Landolphe states they were rarely used.

Warri Crisis

Kings of Warri Kingdom, 1480 to present
The Kingdom of Warri has remained predominantly Christian since the coronation of its first Christian King/Olu Atorongboye also known as King Sebastian I in 1570, within a century of the foundation of the Iwere Kingdom. Below is a list of the rulers of the Warri Kingdom from inception. Note that written records began with the coronation of Olu Atorongboye Sebastian I in 1570.

References

http://itsekiricanada.com/olu.php

History of Nigeria
Nigerian traditional states